Zegarac or Žegarac is a Slavic surname. Notable people with the surname include:

Dave Zegarac (born 1979), Canadian punk rock musician
Dušica Žegarac (1944–2019), Serbian film and television actress

Serbian surnames